Jim Aernouts (born 23 March 1989 in Antwerp) is a Belgian former professional cyclist, who rode professionally between 2008 and 2021 for the , ,  and  teams. Following his retirement, Aernouts now works as a maître d'hôtel at a restaurant that he owns with his wife in Essen.

Major results

Cyclo-cross

2005–2006
 Junior Superprestige
2nd Sint-Michielsgestel
3rd Ruddervoorde
 UCI Under-23 World Cup
3rd Kalmthout
2006–2007
 1st  National Junior Championships
 Junior Superprestige
1st Gavere
1st Sint-Michielsgestel
1st Ruddervoorde
2008–2009
 Under-23 Gazet van Antwerpen
2nd Oostmalle
2nd Essen
 UCI Under-23 World Cup
3rd Pijnacker
 3rd Niel
2009–2010
 1st  National Under-23 Championships
 UCI Under-23 World Cup
1st Koksijde
 Under-23 Gazet van Antwerpen
1st Oostmalle
3rd Hasselt
2nd Essen
 2nd Overall Under-23 Superprestige
3rd Vorselaar
3rd Gavere
3rd Ruddervoorde
2010–2011
 1st Overall Under-23 Superprestige
1st Ruddervoorde
1st Hamme
1st Middelkerke
2nd Zonhoven
2nd Hoogstraten
3rd Gavere
 Under-23 Gazet van Antwerpen
1st Hasselt
1st Lille
2nd Oostmalle
3rd Namur
2011–2012
 3rd Harderwijk
2012–2013
 1st Contern
 BPost Bank Trophy
3rd Oostmalle
2013–2014
 1st Nagusia
 2nd Rucphen
2014–2015
 3rd Brabant
2015–2016
 2nd Rucphen
 Toi Toi Cup
2nd Slaný
2016–2017
 2nd Rucphen
 Trek Cup
2nd Waterloo Day 1
2nd Waterloo Day 2
2017–2018
 2nd Rucphen
 National Trophy Series
3rd Abergavenny
2018–2019
 Toi Toi Cup
1st Slaný
 2nd Mol
 2nd Munich
2019–2020
 1st Podbrezová
 1st Topoľčianky
 3rd Iowa City Race 3

Road
2015
9th Overall Course de la Solidarité Olympique

References

External links

1989 births
Living people
Belgian male cyclists
Cyclists from Antwerp
Cyclo-cross cyclists